Jeon Hae-rim (born 28 June 1978), better known by her stage name Ha Ji-won is a South Korean actress. She is best known for the historical dramas Damo (2003), Hwang Jini (2006), and Empress Ki (2013), as well as the melodrama Something Happened in Bali (2004), the romantic comedy series Secret Garden (2010), The King 2 Hearts (2012) and the medical drama Hospital Ship (2017).

She has starred in several films and television series, and is one of South Korea's most sought after and critically acclaimed actresses, particularly known for her versatility in pulling off roles in various genres such as action, comedy, horror, drama, sports and medical.

Early life and education
Jeon Hae-rim was scouted by an agency when she was a senior high school student. The actress stated, "Ever since I was a little kid, I dreamed of becoming an actress. When I was a senior in high school, an agency contacted me after seeing my picture at a photography studio." She later graduated with a degree in Bachelor of Film and Television (BFTV) in Dankook University. In 2012, the actress revealed that she had failed over 100 auditions before her debut, "I passed my college entrance and written exams and was accepted to the department of theater and film. Before my debut, I auditioned for 100 or so projects but didn't get the roles."

Jeon candidly revealed that she adopted "Ha Ji-won" as her stage name as a favor for her previous manager as it was the name of his first love. "When I was about to debut, the first love of my manager's name was Ha Ji-won. I think he wanted to at least use the name of his love that was not fulfilled. The first time I heard the name Ha Ji-won, I thought it was pretty and also bold."

Career

1996–2001: Beginnings
Ha Ji-won made her TV debut in the 1996 teen drama, New Generation Report: Adults Don't Understand Us. She continued playing supporting roles in dramas, Dragon's Tears and Dangerous Lullaby in 1998 and 1999 respectively. But it was through the popular high school drama School 2, in which she played the role of a troubled teen, that she started to gain fame as an actress.

In 2000, Ha made her film debut in the thriller, Truth Game, alongside Ahn Sung-ki, where she was chosen for the role from a pool of 1,500 prospective candidates. For her portrayal of a bipolar character, Ha was awarded Best New Actress at the 37th Grand Bell Awards and 1st Busan Film Critics Awards. The same year, she starred in Ahn Byeong-ki's horror movie Nightmare, and sci-fi romance film Ditto, which won her the
Best Supporting Actress award at the 21st Blue Dragon Film Awards. Later, Ha reunited with Ditto co-star Kim Ha-neul in the drama, Secret, playing an antagonist role. The drama earned her Best Rookie Actress recognition at the MBC Drama Awards and 37th Baeksang Arts Awards.

In 2001, Ha had her first leading role in Beautiful Life, where she played the role of a chaebol hotelier's daughter, opposite Kim Rae-won. This was followed by another starring role in Days in the Sun opposite Ji Sung.

In 2002, she appeared in Ahn Byeong-ki's in horror movie, Phone. The film was a huge success in South Korea and was also a hit in Italy, officially dubbing her as "Asia's Horror Princess".
Following Phone in the same year was Yoon Je-kyoon's American Pie-inspired movie, Sex Is Zero, co-starring Im Chang-jung. The movie was the third most popular Korean movie in 2002 and ranked fifth among all films released in that year, winning Ha the Popularity Award at the 39th Baeksang Arts Awards.

In 2003, Ha starred in her first historical drama, Damo. Damo was highly popular among viewers in their 20s and 30s and turned into a cultural phenomenon. Ha's performance as a lowly police detective was highly praised and she was given the Top Excellence award at the MBC Drama Awards.

In 2004, she starred in the heavy melodrama, What Happened in Bali, alongside Jo In-sung and So Ji-sub. What Happened in Bali was a huge success, with its final episode reaching a peak rating of 39.7%, and won Ha the coveted Best Actress recognition at the 40th Baeksang Arts Awards. Ha also appeared in two films, internet fiction themed movie, 100 Days with Mr. Arrogant opposite Kim Jae-won and romantic comedy, Love, So Divine with Kwon Sang-woo. However, both films were not as successful with audiences.

Ha then played the role of the female protagonist in Daddy-Long-Legs, which was inspired by the novel of the same title written by Jean Webster. She also starred in Lee Myung-se's martial arts film, Duelist, opposite Kang Dong-won. At the 26th Blue Dragon Awards where Ha won the Popularity Award, she quoted Director Lee's line, "An actor never stops learning." which she said she had always been applying in her life as an actress.

In 2006, Ha starred in Hwang Jini, a period drama based on the real-life history of the character of Hwang Jini, who lived in 16th-century Joseon and is considered the most famous gisaeng in the Korean history. The series was a huge ratings success, giving rise to a boom in gisaeng-themed entertainment—musicals, TV dramas, films, even cartoons. Ha's performance won her the Grand Prize (Daesang) at the 2006 KBS Drama Awards.

In 2007, Ha challenged herself in the role of a female boxer in the comedy film, Miracle on 1st Street. Coming from the team behind Sex Is Zero, the movie became the fifth most popular movie in that year. She then took on the role of a pianist in Miracle of a Giving Fool, which was based on a popular webcomic and won her the Popularity Award at the 44th Baeksang Arts Awards.

In 2009, Ha worked with Director Yoon Je-kyoon for the third time in the blockbuster disaster film Haeundae.
The movie was funded by CJ Entertainment with a budget estimated at US$10–15 million, one of the largest for a Korean production. Haeundae was met with both critical and commercial success. It was the fourth highest-grossing film in South Korea then, giving Ha the honor of "The 10 Million Movie Actress" for bringing more than 10 million audiences. She then starred in Park Jin-pyo's melodrama Closer to Heaven. Ha's heartfelt performance in the film won her the Best Actress Award at the 30th Blue Dragon Film Awards and 46th Baeksang Arts Awards.

2010–2013: International popularity
After taking a four-year break from dramas, Ha made a very successful comeback through the 2010 hit drama, Secret Garden, written by famous writer Kim Eun-sook. She played the role of a stunt woman, who magically switches bodies with a wealthy CEO character (played by Hyun Bin). Proven to be a commercial success, the drama series brought in high domestic ratings and garnered much interest regarding its fashion, catchphrases and music. Ha was awarded the prestige Best Actress at the Grimae Awards.

Ha then starred in science fiction 3D film, Sector 7. Although the film failed to do well in South Korea, it was a hit in China, garnering over 20 million yuan in China after just one week, beating previous records set by 200 Pounds Beauty at 16 million yuan. Ha had spent eight hours a day swimming and training with weights to get in shape for the role, obtained a scuba diving certificate and motor license in a week to "immerse" herself in character.

In 2012, Ha starred in alternate history drama The King 2 Hearts opposite Lee Seung-gi, playing the role of a North Korean Special Forces Officer who married a South Korean crown prince as a political strategy. It was also revealed that Ha had studied the North Korean dialect to make her portrayal of the character more realistic and genuine. Ha then acted in sports film As One, playing the role of a South Korean table tennis player. As Ha had simultaneously portrayed a North and South Korean character on the small and big screen, she was dubbed as "The Flower of Reunification" for crossing boundaries of the two nations.

In 2013, Ha was awarded her second Daesang award for her performance as the titular character in the hit historical drama Empress Ki. The drama achieved high viewership ratings throughout its run on MBC, and was also well-received overseas; particularly in Taiwan.

2014–present: Returning to the mainstream
In 2014, Ha, together with Kang Ye-won and Son Ga-in of Brown Eyed Girls, then starred in the Charlie's Angels-inspired action fusion saeguk, The Huntresses.

In 2015, Ha was cast by Ha Jung-woo to play his character's wife in his self-directed movie, Chronicle of a Blood Merchant, a film adaption of the bestselling 1995 Chinese novel of the same title written by Yu Hua. Following that, Ha, alongside actor Lee Jin-wook starred in the Korean remake of the 2011 hit Taiwanese drama In Time with You, titled The Time We Were Not in Love. However, in contrast to her previous dramas, The Time We Were Not in Love received low ratings and Ha's performance was called into question. However, the show has received popular ratings among international post-broadcast audiences.

In 2016, Ha starred in the South Korea-China co-production film, Life Risking Romance, alongside Taiwanese actor Chen Bolin.

In 2017, Ha starred in Manhunt, an international co-production by Hong Kong director John Woo. She played a female assassin in the film.
Ha returned to the small screen with MBC's medical drama Hospital Ship, which started airing in August 2017. She plays an ambitious surgeon who finds herself on a hospital ship.
She won the Top Excellence Award at the MBC Drama Awards for her role.

In 2018, Ha joined tvN's space themed variety show, Galileo: Awakened Universe, her first variety show since debut.

In 2019, Ha returned to the big screen with the romance melodrama Chocolate.

In 2020, she starred in Pawn, a COVID-19 delayed, human drama film.

In 2022, it was announced that Ha would hold fan meetings in Japan on November 25 in Tokyo and November 27 in Osaka. In October, Ha made her return to the small screen after five years absent with Curtain Call.

Other activities

Music
Ha Ji-won made an appearance in the music video of Wax's debut song, Mother's Diary in 2000. Soon after, she performed Wax's song, Oppa on stage.

Ha released her debut album Home Run in 2003. The eponymous single from the album Home Run, featuring singer Psy, was later used as the OST for Reversal of Fortune.

After an eight-year hiatus on stage, Ha performed with her labelmates AA for their debut at the K-pop Super Concert in 2011.

On 13 June 2014, Ha released a digital single, Now in This Place, for the fans who had been supportive of her drama Empress Ki. The lyrics of the song was written by the scriptwriter of Empress Ki, Jung Kyung Soon; and composed and produced by popular music producer Jae Chong (also known as Jung Jae-yoon).

In June 2015, Ha released a self-written song, You Are Zoe, featuring ZE:A's Heechul. She personally wrote the song while working on OnStyles Go Go with Sister in Grasse, France. The track was composed by singer The Film.

Fashion, books and film
In 2012, Ha gave a lecture on movie production in China as part of CJ CGV's cultural exchange program Toto's Workroom. As part of her contract with fashion label Crocodile Lady, Ha launched her own "Secret Jeans" line and designed a handbag for the brand which was sold for 179,200 won ($157).
The same year, she published her first book "This Moment".

Social activities

Ambassadorship

 Ha Ji-won is the first Asian woman and second Asian after Jackie Chan to be named promotional ambassador for Operation Smile.

Charity
Although organ donation was not common in South Korea at that time in January 2005, Ha Ji-won made the pledge to donate her cornea through the Organ Donation Center of Love. The actress shared, "When I was in crisis of becoming blind in  because of damaged cornea in my left eye while filming, but one prisoner sent me a letter expressing his willing to donate his own cornea to me, I was very thankful and greatly touched. I want to be of help to the visually impaired. It's shocking and pitiful that we import cornea from other countries."

Ha has also played an active role in helping underprivileged and disabled children, running a donation project named Smile Again Foundation with Gangnam-gu Family Welfare Center. The project was supplemented by Ha Ji-won's fan club members while she went the extra mile to ensure the sustainability of the project. Ha was conferred the Prime Minister's Award for the '2008 Family Month Event', in recognition of her consistent and active hard work in contributing to programs for poor and handicapped families.

In 2012, Ha donated the proceeds from her first book, At This Moment, to charity. The recipients of the book earnings, children's aid group Choi Kyung Joo Foundation and Yonsei University Hospital, announced their decision to set up a scholarship for prospective arts students and to subsidize treatment for deaf and blind children respectively. Sponsored by Ha, the organization has set up a "Hartist" (Ha + artist) scholarship to sponsor students who dream of careers in art.

Together with fellow actor Song Joong-ki, Ha attended Medical Korea 2013 Sharing Medical Treatment Commemorative Event, an event hosted by the Ministry of Health and Welfare, promoting greater international co-operation for medical technology and positive medical tourism. During the event, both actors spent time with recovering children and received an award for their previous efforts in promoting the sharing of medical services.

In 2015, Ha, fashion icon Ko So-young, and figure skater Yuna Kim designed bags in cooperation with the Italian luxury brand Fendi. The bags were offered via Seoul Peekaboo Project auction to raise funds for the charity. As Operation Smile's Ambassador, Ha decided to donate the proceeds from the bag she designed to Operation Smile, a NGO that performs cleft lip and cleft palate surgery and delivers postoperative and ongoing medical therapies to children in low and middle income countries.

In 2016, Ha donated W100 million (US$83 604) to help victims of ferry disaster.

Management
In 2013, Ha was reported to be leaving Wellmade STARM, her agency for ten years. She declined all the calls sent by other agencies with giant contracts and decided to establish her own one-person agency Haewadal Entertainment (lit. Sun and Moon Entertainment) instead. Also in the same year, Ha signed with United Talent Agency, one of the largest talent agencies in the world, for her Hollywood venture.

After establishing her own agency, Haewadal Entertainment, Ha simultaneously signed a contract with BM+ Entertainment to manage her activities abroad. In the same year, Ha signed with Invincible Plan to manage her Chinese ventures.

Filmography

Discography

Albums

Digital singles

Bibliography

Awards and nominations

Other recognition

Listicles

References

External links

 
 
 

South Korean film actresses
South Korean television actresses
South Korean television presenters
South Korean women television presenters
Dankook University alumni
1979 births
Living people
Actresses from Seoul
20th-century South Korean actresses
21st-century South Korean actresses
21st-century South Korean women singers
Best Actress Paeksang Arts Award (film) winners
Best Actress Paeksang Arts Award (television) winners